The following is a list of episodes for the Warner Bros. and Amblin Entertainment animated television series Animaniacs. The series first premiered on Fox Kids on September 13, 1993. It would later air on Kids' WB from September 9, 1995, until the series finale aired on November 14, 1998, after 99 episodes. 

A feature-length direct-to-video film, Wakko's Wish, was released on December 21, 1999. The series also had a spin-off series Pinky and the Brain, which premiered on September 9, 1995, and concluded on November 14, 1998.

Series overview

Episodes 
The segments indicate in colors by which characters starred in them:
 Blue = Yakko, Wakko, and Dot (150 segments)
 Red = Pinky and the Brain (19 segments)
 Green = Slappy Squirrel (28 segments)
 Orange = Goodfeathers (14 segments)
 Brown = Buttons and Mindy (14 segments)
 Maroon = Rita and Runt (12 segments)
 Purple = The Hip Hippos (5 segments)
 Yellow = Chicken Boo (15 segments)
 Tan = The Flame (3 segments)
 Magenta = Minerva Mink (2 segments)
 Pink = Katie Ka-Boom (7 segments)
 Gray = One-Shot / Ensemble (31 segments)

Season 1 (1993–94)

Season 2 (1994)

Season 3 (1995–96)

Season 4 (1996)

Season 5 (1997–98)

Specials

Marathon special (1998)

Film (1999)

Home media

VHS 
Several VHS videos were released in the United States in the United Kingdom and Australia.  The British and Australian VHS tapes were put in "volumes", which were generally jumbled at random and are in no particular order with the series.  The U.S. videotapes, however, (with the exception of Animaniacs Stew) feature episodes that had focused on one general subject. Each video featured four to five skits each and was accompanied by a handful of skit intros, with a running time of about 45 minutes.

United Kingdom/Australia

United States

DVD 
Volume 1 of Animaniacs had sold very well; over half of the product being sold in the first week made it one of the fastest-selling animation DVD sets that Warner Home Video ever put out. All 99 episodes are available in four DVD boxed sets, although only Volume 1 has been released outside of Region 1. On October 2, 2018, a Complete Series DVD boxed set featuring all 99 episodes and Wakko's Wish, was released.

Notes

References 

Episodes
1990s television-related lists
Animaniacs
Animaniacs